is a former Japanese football player. His brother Hajime Moriyasu is also a former football player.

Playing career
Moriyasu was born in Nagasaki Prefecture on January 29, 1972. After graduating from high school, he joined Regional Leagues club Mazda Auto Hiroshima in 1990. In 1992, he moved to Japan Football League (JFL) club Seino Transportation. He played many matches in 2 seasons. In 1994, he moved to JFL club PJM Futures (later Tosu Futures, Sagan Tosu). He played many matches and the club was promoted to new league J2 League from 1999. He retired end of 2000 season.

Club statistics

References

External links

1972 births
Living people
Association football people from Nagasaki Prefecture
Japanese footballers
J2 League players
Japan Football League (1992–1998) players
Seino Transportation SC players
Sagan Tosu players
Association football defenders